Acarigua, founded as San Miguel de Acarigua, is a city in northwestern Venezuela, in the northern part of the state of Portuguesa.
 
Formerly the state capital, it is a major commercial center for the northern Llanos region of South America. It is contiguous with the neighboring city of Araure.

Demographics 
The city's population was 116,551 in 1990 and was estimated at 208,495 in 2008.

Religion 
Its Cathedral Catedral de Nuestra Señora de la Corteza is the episcopal see of the Roman Catholic Diocese of Acarigua–Araure.

Geography

Climate

Fauna
The Thysania agrippina is one of the world's largest moths, with wings  in size.

Flora
The saman or Samanea saman is the most widespread tree throughout the city.

Protected areas
 Parque Musiu Carmelo
 Parque Mittar Nakichenovich
 Balneario Sabanetica
 Balneario el Mamón
 Parque Curpa, popularly known as José Antonio Páez Park.

Production 
Acarigua is a principal commercial center of the northern portion of the Llanos (plains), in which cattle, peanuts, sorghum, cashews, beans, cotton, corn (maize), and rice are the principal products.

Media 
Acarigua is home to 3 regional newspapers, and the community TV station Siguaraya TV.

Transport 
Acarigua is served by the Oswaldo Guevara Mujica Airport.

Sports 

It is home to Portuguesa FC, whose home stadium is the Estadio General José Antonio Paez.

Notable people 
 Luis Antonio Herrera Campins (1925-2007), was President of Venezuela

See also 
 Araure
2019 Portuguesa, Venezuela prison uprising

References

External links 

 https://web.archive.org/web/20130518175934/http://acarigua-araure.net/

 
Cities in Portuguesa (state)
Populated places established in 1620
1620 establishments in the Spanish Empire